Francisco Eugenio Provvidente (first name also spelled Francesco) (born February 1, 1914 in Buenos Aires) was an Argentine professional football player. He also held Italian citizenship.

He played for 2 seasons (21 games, 5 goals) in the Serie A for A.S. Roma.

1914 births
Year of death missing
Argentine footballers
Argentine Primera División players
Boca Juniors footballers
Argentine expatriate footballers
Expatriate footballers in Brazil
CR Flamengo footballers
Serie A players
A.S. Roma players
Club Atlético Vélez Sarsfield footballers
Argentine expatriate sportspeople in Brazil
Argentine expatriate sportspeople in Italy
Association football forwards
Footballers from Buenos Aires